Mona Lisa is an EP by South Korean boy band MBLAQ. The album was released online on July 12 and physically on July 15. The online pre-orders started on July 8, 2011. The album consists of six new tracks, and the title track, also called Mona Lisa is a Spanish electronic dance track.

Concept
The concept features the members parodying famous historical figures; Seungho chose Papillon, G.O chose James Dean, Joon chose Zorro, Thunder chose Boy George, and Mir chose The Beatles.

Promotions
The group started promoting the title track "Mona Lisa" starting July 14 on TV music shows such as Mnet's M! Countdown. The song "I Think You Know" was used for the comeback. They finished promoting the song on August 28 and followed with the song "I Don't Know" on September 1. The promotions of the song and the EP ended on September 11.

Track listing
All the songs (except Ojos Frios) were written by Rado, Ji-in, Won-taek & DoK2, composed by Rado, Ji-in & Won-taek and arranged by Rado.

Charts

Album chart

Single chart

Sales and certifications

Release history

References

External links
 MBLAQ's Official Site

MBLAQ EPs
Mona Lisa
Korean-language EPs